Senator Shull may refer to:

Doug Shull (born 1943), Iowa State Senate
Joseph Horace Shull (1848–1944), Pennsylvania State Senate